NGC 2032 (also known as ESO 56-EN160 and the Seagull Nebula) is an emission nebula in the Dorado constellation and near the supershell LMC-4 and it consists of NGC 2029, NGC 2035 and NGC 2040. It was first discovered by James Dunlop on 27 September 1826, and John Herschel rerecorded it on 2 November 1834. NGC 2032 is located in the Large Magellanic Cloud.

References

ESO objects
2032
Emission nebulae
Supernova remnants
Astronomical objects discovered in 1826
Large Magellanic Cloud
Dorado (constellation)